The tenth season of the Cuban National Series ended with Azucareros taking the title, finishing just ahead of a group including Habana, Granjeros and Industriales.

The season was shortened from 99 to 65 games.

Standings

References

 (Note - text is printed in a white font on a white background, depending on browser used.)

Cuban National Series seasons
Cuban National Series
1970 in Cuban sport
1971 in Cuban sport